MSC Pamela was built by Samsung Heavy Industries and launched in 2005. The vessel's engine, also built by Samsung Heavy Industries, consumes 248 tonnes of heavy fuel oil per day.

The vessel measures 336.6m in length, a draft of 15m, with a gross tonnage of 107,200 and with a breadth of 45.6m (150ft); is capable of a maximum speed of 25.2 knots.  She sails under the Panamanian flag for the Mediterranean Shipping Company.

At its launch, MSC Pamela broke the world records for the number of containers that could be carried on a single vessel. As a post-Panamax vessel, and therefore unable to pass through the Panama Canal, she operates between the major ports of Europe and the Far East.

References

Container ships
Ships built by Samsung Heavy Industries
2005 ships